Greatest Hits is a compilation album by the British pop group Five Star released in 1989. It was the group's first 'greatest hits' collection after a run of successful singles and albums since 1985. It contains all of the band's UK Top 50 singles including the non-album single, "With Every Heartbeat", which was released earlier in the year (although that track was not included on the LP version). Another new track, "Something About My Baby", was included on the CD and cassette versions of the album but was not released as a single. This track was composed by David Gamson of the synthpop trio Scritti Politti.

The release of Greatest Hits marked the end of the group's association with RCA Records. However, the album proved to be Five Star's least successful release up to that point, selling only 15,500 copies and peaking at a lowly #53 on the UK Albums Chart, highlighting the band's rapid decline in popularity.

After the release of Greatest Hits, the group signed to Epic Records and immediately began planning a new album for the following year, the  Five Star album. However, this new album was not released in the UK.

Track listing
 "Can't Wait Another Minute" (7" edit) 4:30 from Silk & Steel
 "Whenever You're Ready" (7" edit) 4:18 from Between the Lines
 "Rain or Shine" (7" single) 4:00 from Silk & Steel
 "Find the Time" (7" remix edit) 3:58 from Silk & Steel
 "System Addict" 4:04 from Luxury of Life
 "Stay Out of My Life" (7" edit) 3:51 from Silk & Steel
 "Let Me Be the One" (7" edit) 3:40 from Luxury of Life
 "Rock My World" (7" edit) 4:06 from Rock the World
 "With Every Heartbeat" (CD and cassette only) 4:11 Non-album single
 "The Slightest Touch" (7" remix) 4:19 from Silk & Steel
 "All Fall Down" 3:30 from Luxury of Life
 "If I Say Yes" (U.S. 7" remix) 3:43 from Silk & Steel
 "Somewhere Somebody" (7" edit) 4:06 from Between the Lines
 "R.S.V.P." (7" edit) 3:28 from Luxury of Life
 "Strong as Steel" (7" edit) 4:27 from Between the Lines
 "Love Take Over" 3:49 from Luxury of Life
 "Another Weekend" (7" edit) 4:10 from Rock the World
 "Something About My Baby" (CD and cassette only) 3:43 Previously unreleased

References

Five Star compilation albums
1989 greatest hits albums